Milen Nachev(born 1957 in Bulgaria) is a Bulgarian/American conductor.

Milen attended the Saint Petersburg Conservatory in Russia. There, he received his master's degree in Symphonic and Opera conducting.

Nachev was Artistic Director & Conductor of the Bulgarian National Radio Symphony Orchestra (BNR) from 1994 until 2002, where he conducted recordings that were broadcast by the BBC.

In November 1997, EMI/Virgin released the CD 'Mozart in Egypt', which was conducted by Nachev while with the BNR Symphony Orchestra.

Since 2012, Mr. Nachev has been a conductor with Shen Yun Performing Arts—an international touring company based in New York.

References

1957 births
Living people
Bulgarian conductors (music)
Bulgarian emigrants to the United States
Shen Yun
21st-century conductors (music)